Hall County is a county located in the northeast portion of the U.S. state of Georgia. As of the 2020 census, the population was 203,136, up from 179,684 at the 2010 census. The county seat is Gainesville. The entirety of Hall County comprises the Gainesville, Georgia, Metropolitan Statistical Area, which is also part of the Atlanta-Athens-Clarke County-Sandy Springs, Combined Statistical Area.

History
Hall County was created on December 15, 1818, from Cherokee lands ceded by the Treaty of Cherokee Agency (1817) and Treaty of Washington (1819).

The county is named for Lyman Hall, a signer of the Declaration of Independence and governor of Georgia as both colony and state.

Geography
The county is located in the upper Piedmont region of the state in the foothills of the Blue Ridge Mountains to the north.

Slightly more than half of Hall County, the eastern portion of the county, is located in the Upper Oconee River sub-basin of the Altamaha River basin, while the western half of the county is located in the Upper Chattahoochee River sub-basin of the ACF River Basin (Apalachicola-Chattahoochee-Flint River Basin).

The Chattahoochee River gathers strength in Hall County, as immortalized in Sidney Lanier's poem, "Song of the Chattahoochee":

OUT of the hills of Habersham,
Down the valleys of Hall,
I hurry amain to reach the plain,
Run the rapid and leap the fall,
Split at the rock and together again,

Adjacent counties

 White County – north
 Habersham County – northeast
 Banks County – east
 Jackson County – southeast
 Barrow County – south
 Gwinnett County – southwest
 Forsyth County – west
 Dawson County – northwest
 Lumpkin County – northwest

Attractions
 Atlanta Botanical Garden (Gainesville)
 Brenau Downtown Center (Gainesville)
 Don Carter State Park
 Elachee Nature Science Center (Gainesville)
 Falcons Complex (Flowery Branch)
 Gainesville Theatre Alliance (Gainesville)
 Interactive Neighborhood for Kids (Gainesville)
 Lake Lanier Islands (Buford)
 Lake Sidney Lanier
 Quinlan Visual Arts Center
 Road Atlanta (Braselton)

Transportation

Major highways

  Interstate 985
  U.S. Route 23
  U.S. Route 129
  State Route 11
  State Route 11 Business
  State Route 13
  State Route 51
  State Route 52
  State Route 53
  State Route 53 Connector
  State Route 60
  State Route 82
  State Route 115
  State Route 136
  State Route 211
  State Route 254
  State Route 283
  State Route 284
  State Route 323
  State Route 332
  State Route 347
  State Route 365
  State Route 369
  State Route 419 (unsigned designation for I-985)

Mass transit
 The Gainesville AMTRAK station is situated at 116 Industrial Boulevard. Amtrak's Crescent train connects Gainesville with the cities of New York City, Philadelphia, Baltimore, Washington, Greensboro, Charlotte, Atlanta, Birmingham and New Orleans.
 Gainesville has a bus transit system, the Gainesville Connection, with 130 stops along three routes through Gainesville. The Hall Area Transit Transportation System began operations in January 2001 with three buses and four mini-buses.

Pedestrians and cycling
 Chicopee Woods Bike Trail
 Wilshire Trail

Demographics

Hall County remains extremely rural and many of its residents reside in unincorporated areas, accounting for more than half of the county's population.

2000 census
At the 2000 census, 139,277 people, 80,381 households and 80,009 families resided in the county. There were 51,046 housing units at an average density of 130 per square mile (50/km2). The racial makeup of the county was 80.75% White, 7.27% Black or African American, 0.34% Native American, 1.35% Asian, 0.17% Pacific Islander, 8.75% from other races, and 1.36% from two or more races. About 19.56% of the population were Hispanic or Latino of any race.

Of the 80,381 households, 37.10% had children under the age of 18 living with them, 60.20% were married couples living together, 10.80% had a female householder with no husband present, and 24.00% were not families. About 19.20% of all households were made up of individuals, and 6.70% had someone living alone who was 65 years of age or older. The average household size was 2.89 and the average family size was 3.26.

Age distribution was 26.90% under the age of 18, 10.80% from 18 to 24, 32.30% from 25 to 44, 20.60% from 45 to 64, and 9.40% who were 65 years of age or older. The median age was 32 years. For every 100 females, there were 103.60 males. For every 100 females age 18 and over, there were 101.90 males.

The median household income was $44,908, and the median family income was $50,100. Males had a median income of $31,769 versus $24,550 for females. The per capita income for the county was $19,690. About 8.50% of families and 12.40% of the population were below the poverty line, including 15.20% of those under age 18 and 14.70% of those age 65 or over.

2010 census
As of the 2010 United States Census, there were 179,684 people, 60,691 households, and 45,275 families residing in the county. The racial makeup of the county was 74.1% white, 7.4% black or African American, 1.8% Asian, 0.5% American Indian, 0.1% Pacific islander, 13.9% from other races, and 2.2% from two or more races. Those of Hispanic or Latino origin made up 26.1% of the population. In terms of ancestry, 16.8% were American, 10.6% were Irish, 9.3% were English, and 8.9% were German.

Of the 60,691 households, 40.2% had children under the age of 18 living with them, 56.6% were married couples living together, 12.4% had a female householder with no husband present, 25.4% were non-families, and 20.3% of all households were made up of individuals. The average household size was 2.91 and the average family size was 3.35. The median age was 34.5 years.

The median income for a household in the county was $50,876 and the median income for a family was $57,774. Males had a median income of $38,671 versus $31,378 for females. The per capita income for the county was $23,675. About 11.3% of families and 14.8% of the population were below the poverty line, including 21.3% of those under age 18 and 11.6% of those age 65 or over.

2020 census

As of the 2020 United States census, there were 203,136 people, 65,625 households, and 48,776 families residing in the county.

Education

Colleges and universities
 Brenau University
 Lanier Technical College
 University of North Georgia, Gainesville Campus (formerly Gainesville State College)

High schools
 Cherokee Bluff High School
 Chestatee High School
 East Hall High School
 Flowery Branch High School
 Gainesville High School
 Johnson High School
 Lakeview Academy
 North Georgia Christian School
 North Hall High School
 Riverside Military Academy
 West Hall High School

Middle schools 
 Academies of Discovery at South Hall
 Alternative Learning Center/International Center
 C. W. Davis Middle School
 Cherokee Bluff Middle School
 Chestatee Middle School
 East Hall Middle School
 Gainesville Middle School
 Lanier Career Academy
 North Georgia Christian School
 North Hall Middle School
 West Hall Middle School
 World Language Academy Middle School (Shares building with South Hall)

Communities

Cities

 Buford (mostly in Gwinnett County)
 Flowery Branch
 Gainesville
 Gillsville (partly in Banks County)
 Lula (partly in Banks County)
 Oakwood

Towns
 Braselton (partly in Jackson, Barrow, and Gwinnett Counties)
 Clermont

Unincorporated communities
 Belmont
 Candler
 Chestnut Mountain
 Murrayville (partly in Lumpkin and White Counties)
 Chicopee
 Rabbittown

Politics
Hall County had voting patterns similar to the Solid South, voting Democrat in all presidential elections until 1968, with the exception of narrowly supporting Herbert Hoover against Catholic Democrat Al Smith in 1928. Since then, it has been won by the GOP by landslide margins, in stark contrast to nearby inner suburban counties of Atlanta, with the exception of segregationist George Wallace in 1968 and favorite son Jimmy Carter in both of his campaigns. 

In 2022, local media reported that Hall County Solicitor General Stephanie Woodard was under investigation for allegations of theft and misuse of public funds.

See also

 National Register of Historic Places listings in Hall County, Georgia
 Gainesville Police Department
List of counties in Georgia

References

External links
 Lake Lanier Convention & Visitors Bureau
 Hall County  web site from Roadside Georgia
 Hall County Government official site
 GaGEN Web Hall County section
 This Day in Georgia History: December 15, Ed Jackson and Charly Pou, Carl Vinson Institute of Government, The University of Georgia
 Documents from Hall County at the Digital Library of Georgia
 Hall County Sesquicentennial historical marker
 Historic Redwine historical marker

 
Georgia (U.S. state) counties
1818 establishments in Georgia (U.S. state)
Populated places established in 1818
Hall
Northeast Georgia
Counties of Appalachia